Elachista pollinariella is a moth of the family Elachistidae. It is found from Finland and the Baltic region to the Iberian Peninsula, Italy and Romania and from France to Poland.

The wingspan is 8–10 mm. Adults are on wing from May to June.

The larvae feed on Brachypodium sylvaticum, Elymus repens, Festuca arvernensis, Festuca lemanii, Festuca longifolia, Festuca ovina, Festuca ovina, Festuca rubra, Poa pratensis, Poa trivialis and Trisetum flavescens. They mine the leaves of their host plant. The mine has the form of a descending, gradually widening, transparent corridor. They have an off-white body and black head. Larvae can be found from early spring to the end of May.

References

pollinariella
Moths described in 1839
Moths of Europe